Kevin Ismael Duarte (born 5 September 2001) is an Argentine footballer currently playing as a midfielder for Ferro Carril Oeste, on loan from Boca Juniors.

Career statistics

Club

References

2001 births
Living people
Sportspeople from Lanús
Argentine footballers
Association football midfielders
Argentine Primera División players
Boca Juniors footballers
Ferro Carril Oeste footballers